Vincent Rodney Cheesman (21 May 194314 February 1989), known professionally as Vincent Crane, was an English keyboardist, best known as the organist for the Crazy World of Arthur Brown and Atomic Rooster. Crane co-wrote "Fire", the 1968 hit single by the Crazy World of Arthur Brown.

Biography 
Born Vincent Rodney Cheesman in Reading, Berkshire, he taught himself boogie woogie piano as a teenager before attending Trinity College of Music between 1961 and 1964. Influenced by Graham Bond,  he took up Hammond organ. In late 1966 he formed the Vincent Crane Combo, which comprised bass player Binky McKenzie, sax player John Claydon and drummer Gordon Hadler. In 1967 he teamed up with Arthur Brown in the Crazy World of Arthur Brown. Their debut album, The Crazy World of Arthur Brown (1968) contained the song "Fire", co-written by Crane and a chart-topping hit single in the United Kingdom, the United States and Canada, with Crane's organ and brass arrangement to the fore.

During their first tour of the United States in 1968, Crane suffered a nervous breakdown and returned to the United Kingdom where he spent 3 or 4 months in the mental hospital at Banstead. Crane rejoined the band but on a subsequent tour of the United States, the band disintegrated in June 1969 when Arthur Brown temporarily disappeared to a commune and Crane and drummer Carl Palmer left to form Atomic Rooster, playing their first concert at the Lyceum in London on 29 August headlining over Deep Purple. Atomic Rooster enjoyed success in 1971 with two hit singles, "Tomorrow Night" (written by Crane) and "Devil's Answer". Crane was the one constant member of the band through their many changing lineups, and wrote a slim majority of their material.

Atomic Rooster published their first eponymous album in 1970, and then drummer Carl Palmer left to form Emerson, Lake & Palmer that same year.

Crane suffered from bipolar disorder from at least 1968 onwards, periodically necessitating treatment at both out- and inpatient mental health treatment facilities.

He collaborated with other musicians on a number of albums, including Rory Gallagher (Rory Gallagher, 1971), Arthur Brown (Faster Than the Speed of Light, 1979), Peter Green, Richard Wahnfried, and Dexys Midnight Runners (Don't Stand Me Down, 1985). In 1983, he was part of the one-off blues outfit, Katmandu, with Ray Dorset, Len Surtees, and Peter Green, who recorded the album A Case for the Blues.

Crane died of a deliberate overdose of Anadin tablets in 1989 at age 45.

Discography

Solo 
 1997: Taro Rota (recorded in the late 1970s, Arthur Brown erroneously credited on release)

The Crazy World of Arthur Brown 
 1968: The Crazy World of Arthur Brown

Atomic Rooster 
 1970: Atomic Roooster
 1970: Death Walks Behind You
 1971: In Hearing of Atomic Rooster
 1972: Made in England
 1973: Nice 'n' Greasy
 1980: Atomic Rooster
 1983: Headline News

with Arthur Brown 
 1979: Faster Than the Speed of Light

References

External links 

 Archive of an Atomic Rooster and Vincent Crane site, by his widow Jeannie Crane and dedicated to his memory
 
 

1943 births
1989 suicides
People from Reading, Berkshire
English rock keyboardists
English songwriters
Dexys Midnight Runners members
People with bipolar disorder
Alumni of Trinity College of Music
20th-century English musicians
The Crazy World of Arthur Brown members
Atomic Rooster members
20th-century British male singers
British male songwriters
Katmandu (band) members